A neo-Hookean solid is a hyperelastic material model, similar to Hooke's law, that can be used for  predicting the nonlinear stress-strain behavior of materials undergoing large deformations.  The model was proposed by Ronald Rivlin in 1948.  In contrast to linear elastic materials, the stress-strain curve of a neo-Hookean material is not linear.  Instead, the relationship between applied stress and strain is initially linear, but at a certain point the stress-strain curve will plateau.  The neo-Hookean model does not account for the dissipative release of energy as heat while straining the material and perfect elasticity is assumed at all stages of deformation.

The neo-Hookean model is based on the statistical thermodynamics of cross-linked polymer chains and is usable for plastics and rubber-like substances. Cross-linked polymers will act in a neo-Hookean manner because initially the polymer chains can move relative to each other when a stress is applied. However, at a certain point the polymer chains will be stretched to the maximum point that the covalent cross links will allow, and this will cause a dramatic increase in the elastic modulus of the material.  The neo-Hookean material model does not predict that increase in modulus at large strains and is typically accurate only for strains less than 20%.  The model is also inadequate for biaxial states of stress and has been superseded by the Mooney-Rivlin model.

The strain energy density function for an incompressible neo-Hookean material in a three-dimensional description is

where  are the principal stretches.

For a compressible neo-Hookean material the strain energy density function is given by

It can be shown that in 2D, the strain energy density function is

Several alternative formulations exist for compressible neo-Hookean materials, for example

where  is the first invariant of the isochoric part  of the right Cauchy–Green deformation tensor.

For consistency with linear elasticity,

Cauchy stress in terms of deformation tensors

Compressible neo-Hookean material 
For a compressible Ogden neo-Hookean material the Cauchy stress is given by

where  is the first Piola-Kirchhoff stress.  By simplifying the right hand side we arrive at 

which for infinitesimal strains is equal to 

For a compressible Rivlin neo-Hookean material the Cauchy stress is given by

where  is the left Cauchy-Green deformation tensor, and

For infinitesimal strains

and the Cauchy stress can be expressed as

{| class="toccolours collapsible collapsed" width="80%" style="text-align:left"
!Proof:
|-
| 
The Cauchy stress in a compressible hyperelastic material is given by

For a compressible Rivlin neo-Hookean material,

while, for a compressible Ogden neo-Hookean material,

Therefore, the Cauchy stress in a compressible Rivlin neo-Hookean material is given by

while that for the corresponding Ogden material is

and the Ogden neo-Hookean stress as

The quantities

have the form of pressures and are usually treated as such.  The Rivlin neo-Hookean stress can then be expressed in the form

while the Ogden neo-Hookean stress has the form

|}

Incompressible neo-Hookean material 
For an incompressible neo-Hookean material with 

where  is an undetermined pressure.

Cauchy stress in terms of principal stretches

Compressible neo-Hookean material 
For a compressible neo-Hookean hyperelastic material, the principal components of the Cauchy stress are given by

Therefore, the differences between the principal stresses are

{| class="toccolours collapsible collapsed" width="80%" style="text-align:left"
!Proof:
|-
| 
For a compressible hyperelastic material, the principal components of the Cauchy stress are given by

The strain energy density function for a compressible neo Hookean material is

Therefore,

Since  we have

Hence,

The principal Cauchy stresses are therefore given by

|}

Incompressible neo-Hookean material 
In terms of the principal stretches, the Cauchy stress differences for an incompressible hyperelastic material are given by

For an incompressible neo-Hookean material,

Therefore,

which gives

Uniaxial extension

Compressible neo-Hookean material 

For a compressible material undergoing uniaxial extension, the principal stretches are

Hence, the true (Cauchy) stresses for a compressible neo-Hookean material are given by

The stress differences are given by

If the material is unconstrained we have .  Then

or

The above equation can be solved numerically using a Newton–Raphson iterative root-finding procedure.

Incompressible neo-Hookean material 

Therefore,

Assuming no traction on the sides, so we can write

where  is the engineering strain.  This equation is often written in alternative notation as

The equation above is for the true stress (ratio of the elongation force to deformed cross-section). For the engineering stress the equation is:

For small deformations  we will have:

Equibiaxial extension

Compressible neo-Hookean material 

In the case of equibiaxial extension

Therefore,

The stress differences are

If the material is in a state of plane stress then  and we have

or,

This equation can be solved for  using Newton's method.

Incompressible neo-Hookean material 
For an incompressible material  and the differences between the principal Cauchy stresses take the form

Under plane stress conditions we have

Pure dilation 
For the case of pure dilation

Therefore, the principal Cauchy stresses for a compressible neo-Hookean material are given by

If the material is incompressible then  and the principal stresses can be arbitrary.

The figures below show that extremely high stresses are needed to achieve large triaxial extensions or compressions. Equivalently, relatively small triaxial stretch states can cause very high stresses to develop in a rubber-like material. The magnitude of the stress is quite sensitive to the bulk modulus but not to the shear modulus.

Simple shear 
For the case of simple shear the deformation gradient in terms of components with respect to a reference basis is of the form

where  is the shear deformation.  Therefore the left Cauchy-Green deformation tensor is

Compressible neo-Hookean material 
In this case .  Hence, .  Now,

Hence the Cauchy stress is given by

Incompressible neo-Hookean material 
Using the relation for the Cauchy stress for an incompressible neo-Hookean material we get

Thus neo-Hookean solid shows linear dependence of shear stresses upon shear deformation and quadratic dependence of the normal stress difference on the shear deformation. The expressions for the Cauchy stress for a compressible and an incompressible neo-Hookean material in simple shear represent the same quantity and provide a means of determining the unknown pressure .

References

See also 
 Hyperelastic material
 Strain energy density function
 Mooney-Rivlin solid
 Finite strain theory
 Stress measures

Continuum mechanics
Elasticity (physics)
Non-Newtonian fluids
Rubber properties
Solid mechanics